ǃGãǃne (ǃGãǃnge) is an extinct language of the ǃKwi family which was once spoken near Tsolo and in Umtata District in South Africa, south of Lesotho. The only material on the language is 140 words collected from two semi-speakers in 1931.

Like ǁXegwi, ǃGãǃne is considered an "outlier" among the ǃKwi languages by Güldemann (2005, 2011). Ethnologue and Glottolog count it as a dialect of Seroa, though the two have no demonstrable connection apart from being in the ǃKwi family. The two languages have only one known word in common.

References

Extinct languages of Africa
Tuu languages
Languages of South Africa
Languages extinct in the 20th century